Nogometni klub Grosuplje, commonly referred to as NK Grosuplje or simply Grosuplje, was a Slovenian football club from Grosuplje. The club was dissolved after the 2002–03 Slovenian Second League season. A newly established club named NK Brinje Grosuplje was founded in 2003.

Honours
Slovenian Third League
Winners: 2001–02

Slovenian Fourth Division
Winners: 1998–99

Former international players
Branko Ilić

References

Association football clubs established in 1955
1955 establishments in Slovenia
Association football clubs disestablished in 2003
Defunct football clubs in Slovenia
2003 disestablishments in Slovenia